Lindsey Middleton (born March 6, 1991) is a Canadian actress. She is known for her role in the web series Out With Dad and its subsequent spin-off series Vanessa's Story and Counselling Vanessa.

Career 
Middleton starred on Out With Dad for several seasons, from 2010 to 2017. For her role in Out With Dad (and its spin-offs Vanessa's Story and Counselling Vanessa), she has received various awards and nominations, including an IAWTV Award for Best Lead Actress – Drama in 2015.

In 2017, for her performance in Counselling Vanessa, Middleton received a Canadian Screen Award nomination for Best Performance by an Actress in a Program of Series Produced for Digital Media.

References

External links 
 

Living people
1991 births
Actresses from Ontario
Canadian film actresses
Canadian stage actresses
Canadian web series actresses
21st-century Canadian actresses
People from Fort Erie, Ontario
Canadian people of Scottish descent